In computability theory the  theorem, (also called the translation lemma, parameter theorem, and the parameterization theorem) is a basic result about programming languages (and, more generally, Gödel numberings of the computable functions) (Soare 1987, Rogers 1967).  It was first proved by Stephen Cole Kleene (1943). The name  comes from the occurrence of an S with subscript n and superscript m in the original formulation of the theorem (see below).

In practical terms, the theorem says that for a given programming language and positive integers m and n, there exists a particular algorithm that accepts as input the source code of a program with  free variables, together with m values. This algorithm generates source code that effectively substitutes the values for the first m free variables, leaving the rest of the variables free.

Details

The basic form of the theorem applies to functions of two arguments (Nies 2009, p. 6). In other words, the following extensional equality of functions holds for every x:

 

More generally, for any m, there exists a primitive recursive function  of  arguments that behaves as follows: for every Gödel number p of a partial computable function with  arguments, and all values of x1, …, xm:

 

The function s described above can be taken to be .

Formal statement

 

Informally,  finds the Turing Machine  that is the result of hardcoding the values of  into . The result generalizes to any Turing-complete computing model.

Example
The following Lisp code implements s11 for Lisp.
(defun s11 (f x)
  (let ((y (gensym)))
    (list 'lambda (list y) (list f x y))))

See also
Currying
Kleene's recursion theorem
Partial evaluation

References

 
  (This is the reference that the 1989 edition of Odifreddi's "Classical Recursion Theory" gives on p. 131 for the  theorem.)

External links 

Computability theory
Theorems in theory of computation
Articles with example Lisp (programming language) code